Acts 18 is the eighteenth chapter of the Acts of the Apostles in the New Testament of the Christian Bible. It records the final part of the second missionary journey of Paul, together with Silas and Timothy, and the beginning of the third missionary journey. The book containing this chapter is anonymous, but early Christian tradition uniformly affirmed that Luke composed this book as well as the Gospel of Luke.

Text
The original text was written in Koine Greek and is divided into 28 verses.

Textual witnesses
Some early manuscripts containing the text of this chapter are:
 Papyrus 38 (c. AD 250)
 Codex Vaticanus (325–350)
 Codex Sinaiticus (330–360)
 Codex Bezae (c. 400)
 Codex Alexandrinus (400–440)
 Codex Laudianus (c. 550)

Locations
{{Location map+
| Mediterranean
| width=500
| float=right
| label= Central and eastern Mediterranean Sea
| caption= Places mentioned in (blue) and related to (black) this chapter.
| relief = yes
| places= {{Location map~| Mediterranean
|lat= 43.0 |long= 12
     |mark= Blue_pog.svg
     |marksize=0
     |label= Italy 
     |background=
     |label_size= 80
     |position= top
    }}
}}
This chapter mentions the following places (in order of appearance):
 Athens
 Corinth
 Pontus
 Italy
 Rome
 Macedonia
 Achaia
 Cenchrea
 Ephesus
 Caesarea
 Antioch
 Galatia
 Phrygia
 Alexandria

 Timeline 
This part of the second missionary journey of Paul took place in c. AD 50–52, based on the time when Gallio was proconsul of Achaia.

Corinth (18:1–11)
This part records the founding of the church in Corinth, which was administrative center of the Roman province of Achaea and to become an important center for the Paul's mission. Luke notes the first meeting of Paul with Aquila and Priscilla (verse 2), who are to become his important associates, well known to the Corinthian church (1 Corinthians 16:19; cf. Romans 16:3-4).

Verse 1After these things Paul departed from Athens and went to Corinth.Paul traveled from Athens to Corinth, a distance of about 82 km on modern roads.

Verse 2And he found a certain Jew named Aquila, born in Pontus, who had recently come from Italy with his wife Priscilla (because Claudius had commanded all the Jews to depart from Rome); and he came to them.References to the action of Roman Emperor Claudius (in office AD 41–54) to command "all the Jews to depart from Rome" appear in the writings of Roman historians Suetonius (c. AD 69 – c. AD 122), Cassius Dio (c. AD 150 – c. 235) and fifth-century Christian author Paulus Orosius. Scholars generally agree that these references refer to the same incident as in this verse.Andreas J. Köstenberger, L. Scott Kellum, The Cradle, the Cross, and the Crown: An Introduction to the New Testament (2009)  p. 110, 400

Verse 5
 When Silas and Timothy had come from Macedonia, Paul was compelled by the Spirit, and testified to the Jews that Jesus is the Christ.Luke simplified the story of Paul's mission in Corinth as it follows a familiar sequence (verses 4–5).
"Silas and Timothy": see , .

Verses 9–10And the Lord said to Paul one night in a vision, "Do not be afraid, but go on speaking and do not be silent, 10 for I am with you, and no one will attack you to harm you, for I have many in this city who are my people.""Vision": In the whole book, a vision will indicate where events are headed (cf. Acts 10:9–16 and 16:9–10).
"Attack": or “to set upon, lay a hand on”; “assault” is a contemporary English equivalent very close to the meaning of the original.

Gallio (18:12–17)
Following a relatively quiet period of church growth, opposition flares up again and Paul is brought before the proconsul Gallio. Proconsuls were in office only for one year, so this name provides an important chronological indicator for Luke's narrative, one of the key dates for New Testament chronology.

Verse 12

 When Gallio was proconsul of Achaia, the Jews with one accord rose up against Paul and brought him to the judgment seat,Lucius Junius Gallio Annaeanus or Gallio was a Roman senator and brother of famous writer Seneca. He was the proconsul of Achaia. According to this chapter, he dismissed the charge brought by the Jews against the Apostle Paul. (Acts 18:12–17) His behaviour on this occasion ("but Gallio cared for none of these things", v. 17) showed his disregard for Jewish sensitivities, and also the impartial attitude of Roman officials towards Christianity in its early days. Gallio's tenure can be fairly accurately dated to between 51–52 AD. The reference to proconsul Gallio in the Delphi Inscription, or Gallio Inscription (IG, VII, 1676; SIG, II, 801d; AD 52) provides an important marker for developing a chronology of the life of Apostle Paul by relating it to the trial of Paul in Achaea mentioned in this chapter.The Cambridge Companion to St Paul by James D. G. Dunn (Nov 10, 2003) Cambridge Univ Press  page 20 Therefore, the events of Acts 18 can be dated to this period. This is significant because it is the most accurately known date in the life of Paul.

Matthew Henry claims that the crowd that beat up Sosthenes was enraged at Paul and Gallio. They demonstrated that if Gallio would not judge that they would. Gallio's indifference to the case against Paul could be commendable for its impartiality. However Gallio's indifference to the beating up of an innocent man, Sosthenes, carried indifference too far, not only showing a contempt for the case, but also for the people presenting the case.

Return to Base (18:18-23)
At some point after a long and successful mission in Corinth, Paul decides to return to his base in Syria.

Verse 18So Paul still remained a good while. Then he took leave of the brethren and sailed for Syria, and Priscilla and Aquila were with him. He had his hair cut off at Cenchrea, for he had taken a vow.Matthew Henry claimed that the original text is ambiguous as to who had their hair cut off, it could have been Aquila or Paul. The vow was likely a Nazarite vow with the hair cut signifying completion of the vow period.

"Cenchrea" on the east side of the isthmus was one of two ports for Corinth. It was used for sea journeys to the east via the Saronic Gulf. The other port, Lechaion on the Corinthian Gulf, served the trade routes leading west (to Italy and beyond). In the Epistle to the Romans a church was mentioned to be there, of which Phoebe was a deacon and patron (Romans 16:1–2).

Interlude: Apollos in Corinth (18:24-28)
In an interlude, Luke gives a rare glimpse of Apollos, an Alexandrian Jew, an independent missionary at work within the almost-exclusive Pauline sphere. Apollos is a member of one of the largest Jewish communities in the ancient world, with a complex and well-established tradition of philosophical hermeneutics of which Philo is the best-known proponent (cf. 1 Corinthians 1:12; 3:4-9; 4:6; 16:12). Perhaps because he displays some of the 'wisdom' that Paul lacks, Apollos has gained a following within the Corinthian church. Apollos received a sufficiently Christian instruction to speak about 'the way of the Lord' (verse 25), but it stops short at the 'baptism of John' (Acts 19:3). Priscilla and Aquila presumably heard Apollos in the synagogue and then provide whatever further instruction is needed (verse 26).

Verse 26And he began to speak boldly in the synagogue: whom when Aquila and Priscilla had heard, they took him unto them, and expounded unto him the way of God more perfectly."More perfectly": translated from Greek , '', "more accurately".

See also
 Apollos
 Claudius
 Priscilla and Aquila
 Sosthenes
 Related Bible parts: Acts 14, Acts 15, Acts 16, Acts 17

Notes

References

Sources

External links
 King James Bible - Wikisource
English Translation with Parallel Latin Vulgate
Online Bible at GospelHall.org (ESV, KJV, Darby, American Standard Version, Bible in Basic English)
Multiple bible versions at Bible Gateway (NKJV, NIV, NRSV etc.)

18